Costa Rica competed at the 2019 Parapan American Games held from August 23 to September 1, 2019 in Lima, Peru. In total, athletes representing Costa Rica won three silver medals and one bronze medal. The country finished in 18th place in the medal table.

Medalists

Cycling 

Henry Raabe won the silver medal in the men's road race C 1–3.

Swimming 

Camila Haase Quiros won the silver medal in the women's 100 m breaststroke SB8 event.

Table tennis 

Steven Roman won the silver medal in the men's singles C8 event.

Taekwondo 

Andres Molina won one of the bronze medals in the men's -75 kg event.

References 

2019 in Costa Rican sport
Nations at the 2019 Parapan American Games